The 1913 Antique Office of Alishan House-Local Cultural Building is a museum in Alishan National Scenic Area, Alishan Township, Chiayi County, Taiwan.

History
The site where the museum stands today used to be a club for the forestry agency employees during the Japanese rule of Taiwan which was constructed in 1913 in a three building complex. A fire engulfed the two buildings, which left only one building until today. After the handover of Taiwan from Japan to the Republic of China, the building was used as a guest house. On 15 August 2018, the building was reopened as a museum named 1913 Antique Office of Alishan House-Local Cultural Building.

Architecture
Located at an elevation of 2,200 meters above sea level, the museum is the highest museum in Taiwan. It is part of Alishan House, a historic hotel in the area. The building was designed with Taiwan Cypress design.

Exhibitions
The museum exhibits the history, culture, education and arts of Alishan.

See also
 List of museums in Taiwan

References

2018 establishments in Taiwan
Museums established in 2018
Museums in Chiayi County